Sir William Arrindell CB (12 October 1796 – 27 December 1862) was a British judge.

Born in Tortola, the Virgin Islands, he was educated in England. Arrindell worked as barrister in Georgetown and in 1824, he defended John Smith in his trial. Arrindell became Attorney-General of British Guiana in 1845 and was subsequently appointed Chief Justice of British Guiana in 1852. He was created a Knight Bachelor in 1858 and was made a Companion of the Order of the Bath in the same year.

He died at Demerara, aged 66, from the consequences of a fall from a staircase. His funeral procession stretched for half a mile and was the greatest British Guiana had seen so far.

References

1796 births
1862 deaths
Chief Justices of British Guiana
Companions of the Order of the Bath
Knights Bachelor
Attorneys-General of British Guiana
Accidental deaths in Guyana
Accidental deaths from falls